"Walking Down Madison" is a 1991 song by Kirsty MacColl featuring Aniff Cousins. It charted at No. 23 on the UK Singles Chart and impacted a number of Billboard charts.

Background
The song was written after MacColl was searching for a new musical direction but instead found writer's block; she tried writing things and asked others to try but it failed to click. Meanwhile, Smiths guitar player Johnny Marr had just come away from the Smiths (they'd split up a week earlier) and had written a song with the intent of writing a dance-based guitar record. Despite it being the first song he had written after the split of the Smiths, he had kept it to one side for his own solo record after the presentation of some of his new material resulted in his friends stealing the tracks. Marr sent MacColl a tape containing the demo and other ideas as he was not interested in writing words at the time. Once MacColl had heard his guitar, she adjoined it with her lyrics and assembled a melody, and recorded the results at Electric Lady Studio. The track also sports a more hip-hop-influenced sound than her previous work and features production from her-then husband Steve Lillywhite. It also features rapper Aniff Cousins, who came to MacColl's attention after she heard the single "Black Whip" by his band Chapter and the Verse.

In a 1991 interview with Melody Maker, MacColl commented on the song's social message, "It was quite an observational song, I really did see a beaming boy from Harlem, even if it wasn't on Madison. It's a nod to Bob Marley, it's 'I Shot the Sheriff', really, isn't it! That idea of being pulled for something you may or may not have done, and that you're more likely to get pulled if you look a certain way."

"Walking Down Madison" was released in 1991 opening the album Electric Landlady, on which it is the longest song. However, on most of her compilation albums, the 7" edit is used instead of the full album version. A selection of remixes by Howard Gray appeared across the various single formats.

Music video
A music video was produced for the song. It was shot on location on Madison Avenue and features interspersed advertisements for Electric Landlady. It shows both a smartly dressed MacColl walking down Madison amidst smartly dressed business men during the daytime and a more-scruffily-dressed MacColl with women sleeping rough, the "beaming boy from Harlem with the air force coat" (which is mentioned in the lyrics of the song), a man with a knife on the A-train and other assorted characters at night whilst Londonbeat dance. Cousins appears both during the day and at night. The night-time characters arrive in a chauffeur-driven limousine and depart in it at the end of the video.

Critical reception
Upon its release, Music & Media noted the song's display of the "new styled MacColl" and described it as "match[ing] modern dance material as supplied by acts like Massive Attack or the Banderas." Terry Staunton of New Musical Express was more critical, describing the song as "overall a bad idea" on which MacColl "goes dance frenzy". He noted, "Her soft and sombre vocals are ill-matched against the shufflebeat [and] it doesn't quite give off the same sparks as the Suzanne Vega/DNA link-up on 'Tom's Diner'. Stanton felt the song "might dent the charts on novelty value" and described Cousins' rap as "ok", but felt MacColl was better suited on the "sugary pop" of her previous works "Days" and "Don't Come the Cowboy with Me Sonny Jim!".

In the US, Billboard described the song as a "credible pop/hip-hop track that comes off at times like a tougher version of Suzanne Vega's "Tom's Diner"." They noted the "infectious melody", "intelligent lyrics", "slicing guitars" and "affecting rap" from Cousins. Pitchfork retrospectively commended the record as a "subtle, scathing takedown of the city’s neon facade".

Uses in other media
MacColl performed this song on Top of the Pops. Alison Moyet has covered this song live having been offered the chance to record it. Co-writer Johnny Marr has also covered the track. In addition, Iain Banks included it on Personal Effects, a CD intended as music to listen to whilst driving.

Charts

References

1991 songs
1991 singles
Kirsty MacColl songs
Songs about New York City
Songs written by Kirsty MacColl
Songs written by Johnny Marr
Song recordings produced by Steve Lillywhite
Virgin Records singles
Songs about streets